Pinto Mountain is a summit, north of Round Valley, within the Mojave National Preserve, in San Bernardino County, California.

References 

Mojave National Preserve
Mountains of California
Mountains of the Mojave Desert
Mountains of San Bernardino County, California